Paula Zelenko is a Michigan politician who formerly served as Burton, Michigan's mayor and a member of the Michigan House of Representatives.

Career 
In 1991, Zelenko was elected to the Burton City Council, serving until 2001. She was then elected to the Michigan House of Representatives, serving the 50th district until 2006. Zelenko returned to the Burton City Council in 2008 and served until December 2010. In 2010, she was an unsuccessful candidate for the 26th district of the Michigan Senate. In November 2010, Burton Mayor Charles Smiley was elected to the Michigan House of Representatives. The council had pre-selected Zelenko prior to Smiley's resignation date. In 2019, Zelenko announced she would not seek a third term as mayor. On November 18, 2019, Duane Haskins was sworn in as Zelenko's successor.

References

Living people
Democratic Party members of the Michigan House of Representatives
Mayors of places in Michigan
Women mayors of places in Michigan
Women state legislators in Michigan
Michigan city council members
People from Burton, Michigan
Women city councillors in Michigan
20th-century American politicians
20th-century American women politicians
21st-century American politicians
21st-century American women politicians
Year of birth missing (living people)